As-Sultaniyah   is a village in the Bint Jbeil District, in southern Lebanon, located just north of Tebnine. It was earlier called el Yehudiyeh.

Name
According to E. H. Palmer in 1881,  El Yehûdîyeh meant "the Jews" or "Jewish woman."

History
In 1881, the PEF's Survey of Western Palestine (SWP)  described it as: "A small village, containing about 100 Metawileh, situated in a valley, with olives, figs, and arable land. There is a spring and cisterns at the village." They further noted that south of the village was a perennial spring, built up with masonry.

References

Bibliography

External links
Soultaniyeh, Localiban
Survey of Western Palestine, Map 2:   IAA, Wikimedia commons

Populated places in Bint Jbeil District
Shia Muslim communities in Lebanon